The Islamic Solidarity Sports Federation (ISSF; Arabic: الاتحاد الرياضي للتضامن الاسلامي) is the supreme authority governing the Islamic Solidarity Games. It is an international, non-profit, non-governmental organization based in Riyadh, Saudi Arabia. Its mission is to increase the cooperation between the Islamic countries through sports. Currently, HRH Prince Abdulaziz bin Turki bin Faisal bin Abdulaziz Al Saud from Kingdom of Saudi Arabia is ISSF President since 8 April 2019.

History
At their 3rd Islamic Summit Conference held in Mecca and Ta'if (1981), the leaders of Islamic world adopted a decision to establish the Islamic Solidarity Sports Federation (ISSF) in order to serve the needs of the OIC member countries in all aspects of sports activities. In 1985 and at the initiative of President of Youth Welfare of Saudi Arabia Prince Faisal bin Fahd bin Abdulaziz Al Saud, the OIC invited the NOCs and Youth and Sports governmental organizations in Muslim countries to attend the constituent assembly for the foundation of the ISSF in the Kingdom of Saudi Arabia. Representatives of 34 Muslim countries attended this assembly and ratified the ISSF statute.
Under the guidance of the Government of the Kingdom of Saudi Arabia, Prince Faisal bin Fahd announced the allocation of the ISSF headquarters to be at the Saudi Arabian Olympic Committee complex in Riyadh city. He also announced the allocation of an annual subsidy from the Kingdom of Saudi Arabia for the administration of the ISSF.

ISSF Presidents

 HE Turki bin Abdulmohsen bin Abdul Latif Al-Sheikh resigned on 28 December 2018.

ISSF Executive Board
The ISSF shall be steered by an Executive Board composed of 17 members, 13 of whom shall be elected directly by the General Assembly. The composition shall be as follows:
The President, one vice-president and two members from each continent i.e. Asia, Europe, Africa and Latin America. Secretary General and Treasurer shall be nominated by the headquarters country and approved by the General Assembly. One representative of the OIC is appointed by the OIC Secretary General. One representative of the country hosting the next edition of Islamic Solidarity Games but without voting rights. The mandate of the Executive Board membership shall be of four years and renewable. Following is the current Executive Board serving 2017 – 2021 term.

Objectives and tasks of ISSF
The stated mission of the Islamic Solidarity Sports Federation (ISSF) is to promote friendship and cooperation between Islamic countries through sports.

 To supervise the organization of a multi-sport event be held once every four years for member countries. This event shall be called the Islamic Solidarity Games.
 To supervise the organization of tournaments and championships in all sports.
 To encourage the exchange of bilateral visits between sports teams of Member countries.
 To enter into cooperation agreements with sports organizations at international, continental and regional levels.
 To train and develop sports cadres in Member states through the exchange of technical expertise and the organization of training courses in various fields of sports.
 To hold conferences, symposia, exhibitions and museums, to supervise studies and researches and to disseminate publications serving the ISSF goals.

See also
Islamic Solidarity Games

References

External links
ISSF official website

Organisation of Islamic Cooperation affiliated agencies
1985 establishments in Saudi Arabia
Sports organisations of Saudi Arabia
Sports organizations established in 1985
International sports organizations
Organisations based in Riyadh